Paraivongius parvulus is a species of leaf beetle of West Africa (Guinea and Ivory Coast), Cameroon and the Democratic Republic of the Congo. It was first described by Martin Jacoby in 1903, as a species of the genus Menius.

References

Eumolpinae
Beetles of the Democratic Republic of the Congo
Beetles described in 1903
Taxa named by Martin Jacoby
Insects of West Africa
Insects of Cameroon